Walter Waring JP DL (1876 – 16 November 1930) was a British politician

The son of Charles Waring, Liberal Member of Parliament for Poole (1874, 1865–1868) and Eliza, daughter of Sir George Denys Bt., of Draycott, Yorkshire, Walter was educated at Eton College.

Military
He joined the 1st Life Guards in 1897, and served in the Second Boer War 1899-1900 (for which he was awarded the Queen's South Africa Medal and six clasps, and was mentioned in dispatches). He was promoted to the rank of captain in 1904. He served in the Yeomanry during World War I in France and Macedonia, 1915–1917, and in the Naval Intelligence Division during 1918 (and was awarded the Legion of Honour).

He was Master of the Horse to the Lord Lieutenant of Ireland in 1906–1907.

Political
Waring was unsuccessful Liberal candidate in Wigtonshire in 1906, and served as the Liberal MP for Banffshire from 1907–1918, and as Coalition Liberal for Blaydon from 1918 to 1922, and a National Liberal for Berwick and Haddington.

from 1922 to 1923, when he lost the seat. He was the Municipal Reform (Conservative) member of London County Council for East Lewisham from 1925 to 1928. He later contested Wallsend as a Conservative in 1929.

He was Parliamentary Private Secretary to the Parliamentary Secretary to the Board of Agriculture and Fisheries in 1909–1910 and to the Secretary of State for War, 1919–1922.

Family
In 1901 he married Lady Clementine Hay CBE, only daughter of William Hay, 10th Marquess of Tweeddale. The couple had two daughters.

References

External links 
 

1876 births
1930 deaths
British Army personnel of the Second Boer War
British Army personnel of World War I
Recipients of the Legion of Honour
Liberal Party (UK) MPs for English constituencies
Members of London County Council
Members of the Parliament of the United Kingdom for Scottish constituencies
People educated at Eton College
UK MPs 1906–1910
UK MPs 1910–1918
UK MPs 1918–1922
UK MPs 1922–1923
Municipal Reform Party politicians
Scottish Liberal Party MPs
Conservative Party (UK) councillors
Deputy Lieutenants of Berwickshire
Conservative Party (UK) parliamentary candidates
National Liberal Party (UK, 1922) politicians